Aag Dur Daag is a 1970 Hindi-language action drama film directed by A. Salaam. The film stars Joy Mukherjee and Madan Puri. The film's music is by Datta Naik.

Plot
Bombay-based Young Raja witnesses his parents commit suicide after being cheated and defeated in a game of cards by an unknown male. He grows up under the mentor-ship of Madanlal, who witnessed the cheating incident, with only one motive - to avenge his parents' death, and becomes an expert at cards. En route to Mahabuleshwar, He meets with wealthy Renu, both fall in love, and gets married. Her widowed father gives him full control of his business as well as much money. Raja opens up a gambling den and hopes to attract the unknown gambler. It is this move that will result in bitterness and turn his life upside down.

Cast
 Joy Mukherjee as Raja
 Poonam Sinha as Renu
 I. S. Johar as Murli (Taxi Driver)
 Madan Puri as Madanlal 'Baba'
 Jayant as Shyam
 Helen as Dancer

Soundtrack

References

External links 
 

1970 films
1970s action drama films
1970s Hindi-language films
Indian action drama films
Films scored by Datta Naik
1970 drama films